Marie Claire is a French international monthly magazine first published in France in 1937, followed by the United Kingdom in 1941. Since then various editions are published in many countries and languages. The feature editions focus on women around the world and global issues. Marie Claire magazine also covers health, beauty, fashion, politics, finance, and career topics.

History
Marie Claire was founded by Jean Prouvost (1885–1978) and Marcelle Auclair (1899–1983) Its first issue appeared in 1937, and it was distributed each Wednesday until 1941 when it handed out its shares to open in London, going international for the first time. In 1976, Prouvost retired and his daughter Évelyne took over the magazine and added L'Oréal Group to the company.

Worldwide

Marie Claire publishes editions in more than 35 countries on five continents.

United States
The U.S. edition of the magazine was started by the Hearst Corporation, based in New York City, in 1994. Hearst has branch offices in France, Italy, and several locations in the United States including Detroit, the West Coast, New England, the Midwest, the Southwest, and the Southeast. The Esquire Network reality television series Running In Heels follows three interns working in the NYC office of the magazine. The editor-in-chief from 2012 to 2020 was Anne Fulenwider. On 9 December 2019, Hearst Magazines announced that Fulenwider would be leaving her post at the end of the year. Aya Kanai, then chief fashion director of Hearst, was named the new editor of the women's magazine and started in January 2020. Sally Holmes took the helm in September from Aya Kanai, who surprised Hearst execs when she jumped ship to Pinterest after just nine months as editor in chief.

During the pandemic, Hearst quietly reduced the title's print frequency from 11 issues to seven in 2020 and instead launched its first digital issue with cover face Janet Mock. It also made Marie Claire's 2020 Power Trip virtual. Power Trip is Marie Claire's annual 36-hour, invite-only, all-expenses-paid networking conference for successful women across all industries that Fulenwider launched in 2016 as a way to make the magazine stand out in the event space. In May 2021, Future US acquired the American edition of Marie Claire magazine from Hearst and has published it since June 2021. In September 2021, it was announced that the Summer 2021 issue of Marie Claire would be its last monthly print edition, and remaining subscribers would receive issues of Harper's Bazaar. That same year, Power Trip was once again an in-person experiential event. In June 2022, Future relaunched Marie Claire in print with its Beauty Changemakers Issue. 

Online, Marie Claire claims to reach 15 million visitors per month.

United Kingdom

Marie Claire launched a UK print edition in 1988, with a website launched in 2006 featuring segments on daily news, catwalk shows, photographs and reports, fashion and beauty, buys of the day, daily horoscopes, and competitions.

Its cover price was increased in February 2018 from £3.99 to £4.20, but this did not compensate for a decline in sales and advertising revenue, with print display advertising down 25% in 2018 and 30% in 2019. In September 2019, the magazine's then owner, TI Media, announced that the final print edition would be published in November and the brand would become digital only, under licence with Groupe Marie Claire. The UK website currently has two million monthly users.

Combined print and digital circulation from July to December 2018 was 120,133 per issue – almost a third of which were free copies, and 4,729 of which were for the digital edition. This was down on the same period in 2017, when the average circulation was 157,412, with 4,012 digital edition readers.

Currently, Marie Claire UK is published by Future Publishing, which acquired TI Media and also owns Marie Claire US.

Australia
Marie Claire magazine is run by magazine and digital publisher Are Media, which acquired Pacific Magazines in 2020.

MarieClaire.com.au launched in 2016 after the digital rights were returned to Pacific Magazines from Yahoo and provides daily fashion, beauty, and lifestyle news. In March 2019, Marie Claire partnered with Salesforce.com to survey Australian women to analyse how attitudes have changed in the workplace.

Japan

The Japanese-language edition of Marie Claire, first published in 1982, was the first international edition published in a non-French speaking territory, as well as the first non-European edition, although it ceased publication after the 9 September issue went on sale in July 2009, due partly to the economic downturn.

Following a relaunch, since 2012, Marie Claire has been published in Japan under the name Marie Claire Style. This new format is offered as a free supplement in the Yomiuri Shimbun and distributed in wealthier suburbs of Japan. The magazine has now been made available at subway kiosks for a ¥200 cover price.

Korea
The first Korean edition of Marie Claire was published in March 1993 by MCK Publishing. Since 2012, the Marie Claire Film Festival has been held in Korea.

Rest of the world

Marie Claire has Arabic editions which are published in Saudi Arabia, Jordan, Kuwait, Lebanon, the United Arab Emirates, Egypt, Morocco and Algeria. In 2010, an Indonesian edition was launched.  The magazine was published in Mexico by Editorial Televisa since 1990 but ceased its publication due to the COVID-19 pandemic in June 2020 and is published again by Fashion Group in June 2021 and started publishing in Argentina under Editorial Perfil in March 2019.

International editions of Marie Claire have been discontinued in Colombia (published from 1990 to 2019), Estonia (published between 2007 and 2010), Germany (published from 1990 to 2003), India, Philippines (published between 2005 and 2009), Indonesia, and Poland.

See also
List of women's magazines
List of Marie Claire cover models

References

External links
 Marie Claire FR
 Marie Claire UK
 Marie Claire Turkey
 Marie Claire US
 Marie Claire AR
 Marie Claire MX
 

1937 establishments in France
Are Media
Women's magazines published in France
French-language magazines
Hearst Communications publications
Magazines established in 1937
Monthly magazines published in France
Monthly magazines published in the United Kingdom
Women's fashion magazines
Multilingual magazines